Stacy Allison (born 1958), raised in Woodburn, Oregon, is the first American woman to reach the summit of Mount Everest, the world's highest mountain, which she did on September 29, 1988.

Biography
Stacy Allison began climbing while a biology student at Oregon State University. She attempted her first major climb at age 21 on Mount Huntington. Her climbing partner broke his ax only 200 feet from the top, and they were forced to turn around. She continued climbing, and in 1988 became the first American woman to reach the summit of Mount Everest. She was later part of a team that marked the 
first successful all women ascent of Dablam, 22,495 ft.

She is the co-author with Peter Ames Carlin of Beyond the Limits: A Woman's Triumph on Everest and the author of Many Mountains to Climb: Reflections on Competence, Courage, and Commitment.

See also
List of 20th-century summiters of Mount Everest

References

American summiters of Mount Everest
Living people
1958 births